The Rotorvox C2A is a two-seat, pusher configuration autogyro developed in Germany.

Design and development
Structurally, the C2A is largely carbon-fibre monocoque. The fuselage pod contains a protective cell for the side-by-side seating behind a large, forward hinged, three piece canopy. A faired pylon, mounted immediately behind the cell supports a two blade aluminium rotor and behind it a  Rotax 914 liquid-cooled flat-four engine drives a three blade propeller.  The rotor is pre-rotated hydraulically.

Flat-sided tail booms are held away from the fuselage on short stubs and each mounts a straight-tapered fin and rudder, their tips linked by the tailplane.  There are shallow, long ventral fins.  The C2A has a short-legged, wide track tricycle undercarriage with its mainwheels near to the forward end of the booms and a nosewheel under the forward fuselage.

At least two prototypes were flown over five years of development before C2A deliveries began in October 2014.

Specifications

References

Single-engined pusher autogyros
2000s German aircraft